A cyclooctadiene (sometimes abbreviated COD) is any of several cyclic diene with the formula (CH2)4(C2H2)2. Focusing only on cis derivatives, four isomers are possible: 1,2-, which is an allene, 1,3-, 1,4-, and 1,5-. Commonly encountered isomers are the conjugated isomer 1,3-cyclooctadiene and 1,5-cyclooctadiene, which is  used as a ligand for transition metals.  These dienes are colorless volatile liquids.

References

External links
1,5-Cyclooctadiene

Cycloalkenes
Dienes
Eight-membered rings